Dolichoderus laotius is a species of ant in the genus Dolichoderus. Described by Santschi in 1920, the species is endemic to Laos.

References

Dolichoderus
Hymenoptera of Asia
Insects of Indonesia
Insects described in 1920